Rhinella scitula is a species of toads in the family Bufonidae. It is found in the southwestern Mato Grosso do Sul, Brazil, and in the adjacent southeastern Paraguay (Amambay and Concepción Departments).

Description
Males measure  and females  in snout–vent length. The species has a robust appearance. The snout is rounded with a small apical apophysis in dorsal view and sub-acuminate in lateral profile. The coloration is variable. The dorsum is generally light brown to dark brown. Light-colored individuals have no pattern or have a cream vertebral line. Darker specimens have a broadish, light brown vertebral stripe. There is a black, triangular inter-ocular spot facing backward, as well as an oblong dorsal blackish spot that connects to another black spot near the urostyle. The belly is light creamy, marbled with light gray.

Habitat and conservation
Breeding takes place in small pools in slow-flowing streams after rainfalls and is of explosive type. Males call mainly during twilight. The species is abundant in seasonal forest areas with rocky outcrops. As of 2004, no threats to this then recently described species had been identified.

References

scitula
Amphibians of Brazil
Amphibians of Paraguay
Amphibians described in 2003
Taxa named by Ulisses Caramaschi
Taxonomy articles created by Polbot